Filemón Camacho (22 November 1926 – 27 June 2012) was a Venezuelan middle-distance runner. He competed in the men's 800 metres at the 1952 Summer Olympics.

References

1926 births
2012 deaths
Athletes (track and field) at the 1952 Summer Olympics
Venezuelan male sprinters
Venezuelan male middle-distance runners
Olympic athletes of Venezuela
Athletes (track and field) at the 1951 Pan American Games
Athletes (track and field) at the 1955 Pan American Games
Pan American Games competitors for Venezuela
People from Miranda (state)
Competitors at the 1954 Central American and Caribbean Games
Central American and Caribbean Games medalists in athletics
Central American and Caribbean Games bronze medalists for Venezuela
20th-century Venezuelan people
Venezuelan sports coaches
Athletics (track and field) officials